This page has a list of lawsuits brought as class actions.

Class action lawsuits

Lawsuits related to class action

See also

Class action lawyers
William Lerach (class action lawyer)
Tim Misny (class action lawyer)
David I. Shapiro (class action lawyer)
Paul Sprenger (lawyer representing employees in class actions)
Harvey Thomas Strosberg (Canadian class action lawyer)
Ted Wells (lawyer representing corporations in class actions)

Class action law firms
Center for Class Action Fairness (law firm representing consumers in class actions)
Edelson McGuire (law firm representing consumers in class actions)

Other persons involved in class actions
William Hohri (class action lead plaintiff)
Harry Kalven (American jurist, a pioneer in class action)

Legislation
Personal Responsibility in Food Consumption Act (in the US)
Securities Litigation Uniform Standards Act (in the US)

Other related topics
2007 National Football League videotaping controversy#Willie Gary lawsuit
2007 pet food recalls#Litigation
2008 Canada listeriosis outbreak#Class-action lawsuits
2009 Sidekick data loss
2009–2011 Toyota vehicle recalls#Litigation
AOL search data leak#Lawsuits
Aaron Broussard#Hurricane Katrina lawsuit
Aeroplan#Class action lawsuit
Agent Orange#U.S. veterans class action lawsuit against manufacturers
Air France Flight 358#Passenger class action
Airborne (dietary supplement)#Class actions and settlements
Albany Law School#Controversy
Algo Centre Mall#Lawsuit
Amway#Class action settlement
Apple Inc. litigation#Consumer class actions
Audi TT#Lawsuits
Aurora Bank#Lawsuits
Banning Lyon#Class action lawsuit
Benson & Hedges#Canadian class action lawsuit
BigBand Networks#Class action lawsuit
Billy Sullivan (American football)#Class action lawsuit
Black Bike Week#Noise limit faces lawsuit
Black Saturday bushfires#Lawsuits
Blizzard Entertainment#StarCraft privacy lawsuit
Bougainville Copper#US lawsuit
Brazilian hair straightening#Class action lawsuits
British American Tobacco#Canadian class action lawsuit\
Brookfield Asset Management#Birch Mountain class action
Buena Vista Rancheria of Me-Wuk Indians of California#History
CEMA (record label distributor)#Lawsuit
California Uninsured Patient Hospital Pricing Litigation
Cameron Inquiry#Lawsuit
Chester Upland School District#Class action lawsuit
Chinese drywall#Lawsuits
Cineplex Entertainment#Class action lawsuit
Clayton College of Natural Health#Closure and lawsuit
Click fraud#Lawsuits
Criticism of Coca-Cola#Racial discrimination
Criticism of Facebook#Class action lawsuit
Criticism of eBay#eBay Motors class action lawsuit
Deepwater Horizon litigation
Denny's#Discrimination
DirecTV#California class action lawsuit
Dow Chemical Company#Nuclear weapons
E18 error#Consumer response and class action
Ed Fagan#2002 Slavery class action lawsuit
Education Management Corporation#Securities fraud class action lawsuit dismissal
Envision EMI, LLC#Lawsuit filed
EverBank#Lawsuit
Fastenal#Employee class-action controversy
Foxtons#Foxtons USA
Fuqi International#Class action lawsuit
GM Instrument Cluster Settlement
Global warming controversy#Litigation
Google Book Search Settlement Agreement#Lawsuit
Google Buzz#Legal issues
Health effects arising from the September 11 attacks#Ground Zero workers' lawsuit
Hitachi Deskstar#Lawsuit
Honda Accord (North America eighth generation)#Brake wear class action lawsuit
Hot Coffee mod#Civil class actions
Howard Engle#Smoking class action suit
Intelius#Class action lawsuits
Japan Tobacco International#Canadian class action lawsuit
Joe Arpaio#Melendres v. Arpaio racial profiling class-action lawsuit
Judicial economy#Class action lawsuits
Kaplan, Inc.#Class-action lawsuit
Keele Valley Landfill#Resident class action lawsuit
Kemper Corporation#Class-action lawsuit
Kids for cash scandal#Victim lawsuits
Kweku Hanson#Class action lawsuit against Ocwen Federal FSB
Lead contamination in Washington, D.C. drinking water#Class-action lawsuit
Long-term effects of benzodiazepines#Class-action lawsuit
Lowe's#Lawsuits
MMR vaccine controversy#MMR litigation starts
Mannatech#Securities Exchange Act class-action lawsuit
Match.com#Controversy
McCullom Lake, Illinois#Class action lawsuit
Medivation#Class action lawsuit
Mercedes-Benz M156 engine#M156 lawsuit
Metabolix#Lawsuit
Money Mart#Lawsuits
MyLife#Class-action lawsuit
Myron W. Wentz#Shareholder lawsuit
NebuAd#Class-action lawsuit
No Fly List#ACLU lawsuit
Oath of Citizenship (Canada)#Public action
Pacific Seafood#Incidents
Panera Bread#Lawsuits
Pefloxacin#Current litigation
PlayStation 3 system software#Class action suit filed over update 3.0
PlayStation 3 system software#Class action suits filed over update 3.21
PlayStation Network outage#Legal action against Sony
Polybutylene#Class action lawsuits and removal from building code approved usage
R2C2#Class action lawsuit
Raytheon#Securities litigation
Resignation of Shirley Sherrod#Class action lawsuit
Ringtone#Lawsuits
RiverCity Motorway#Lawsuit
Shannon, Quebec#Cancer cluster (in Canada)
Shell Oil Company#Polybutylene lawsuit
Singapore Power#Lawsuit
Sony BMG copy protection rootkit scandal#New York and California class action suits
Super Bowl XXXVIII halftime show controversy#Legal action
System access fee#Class action lawsuit
Water contamination in Crestwood, Illinois#Second class action lawsuit
Water contamination in Crestwood, Illinois#Third class-action lawsuit
TD Ameritrade#Security breaches
Tekelec#Shareholder class action lawsuit
Tenaha, Texas#Class action
Texas City Disaster#Legal case
Texas Youth Commission#ACLU lawsuit
The Brick#Lawsuit
The Chiari Institute#Lawsuits
Thomas Jefferson School of Law#2011 class action lawsuit against TJSL
Thomas M. Cooley Law School#Class action against Cooley
Three Cups of Tea#Lawsuits
TracFone Wireless#Class action
True (dating service)#:0
Turkish Republic of Northern Cyprus Representative Office to the United States#Legal action
Tyrone Hayes#Class action lawsuit
United Parcel Service#Employment actions
Vartkes Yeghiayan#Class-action lawsuits
Volkswagen emissions scandal#Legal and financial repercussions
White House FBI files controversy#Judicial Watch lawsuit
WinFixer#Class action lawsuit
Xbox 360 technical problems#Lawsuit
YTB International#Lawsuits

References

External links
Judge certifies Wal-Mart class action - U.S. business- nbcnews.com
The Coalition For Change, Inc. (C4C) (Listing of racial discrimination class actions in the Federal government)
Wal-Mart will pay $40m to workers - The Boston Globe (December 3, 2009)
Mississippi's first class-action lawsuit filed over oil spill - Oil Spill - SunHerald.com (30 April 2010)

Class action